Sir Nicolaas Frederic de Waal  (8 July 1853 – 5 April 1932) was the first Administrator of the Cape Province in South Africa. He was born in Rotterdam, Netherlands and arrived in South Africa in 1880 where he settled in Middelburg and opened a law practice. He became a leading figure in the Afrikaner Bond and in 1898 became a member of the Parliament of the Cape of Good Hope. In 1908, he became Colonial Secretary in the cabinet of Prime Minister John X. Merriman.

After the formation of the Union of South Africa in 1910, De Waal became the Administrator of the Cape Province until his retirement in 1926. As Administrator, he initiated the construction of a high-level road linking the city to the Southern Suburbs, known until 2017 as De Waal Drive. He also initiated the construction of Chapman's Peak Drive between Hout Bay and Noordhoek, a major engineering challenge.

De Waal served as Chief Scout for the Boy Scouts Association in the Cape Province between 1912 and 1926.

References

1853 births
1932 deaths
Afrikaner Bond politicians
Afrikaner people
Waal, Nicolaas Frederic
Members of the House of Assembly of the Cape Colony
Waal, Nicolaas Frederic
Scouting and Guiding in South Africa
South African knights
South African Knights Commander of the Order of St Michael and St George